David Sheasby (20 September 1940 – 26 February 2010) was a playwright, director, dramatist and radio producer who was based in Sheffield, England.

The son of a building engineer, Sheasby was born in Fulwood, Sheffield. He was educated at King Edward VII School, where he was a county-standard cross-country runner. The only time he lived outside Sheffield was when he went to the London School of Economics to read history. Sheasby also trained as a teacher. Dave Sheasby's first wife, Helen Grainger, died from a brain tumour and in 2004 he married Eve Shrewsbury, who survives him along with three children from each marriage. They lived in the heart of Nether Edge.

He started his radio career in 1967 at Radio Sheffield as education producer and from 1988 onwards, worked for BBC Radio 4. In addition to his work for the BBC, from 2002 to 2004 he taught Media Studies and Creative Writing at University of Leeds as Royal Literary Fund fellow and taught Media Studies and Creative Writing at University of Warwick as Royal Literary Fund fellow between 2004 until his death in 2010.

His work includes a number of original plays and comedies including Apple Blossom Afternoon, which in 1988 won a Giles Cooper Award, The Blackburn Files and Street and Lane. His dramatisations of Erich Maria Remarque's novel All Quiet on the Western Front, the 2009 dramatisation of Kurt Vonnegut's science fiction novel Slaughterhouse-Five were also critically acclaimed.

At the time of his death, he had just completed an adaptation of J.L. Carr's novel A Month in the Country. He completed the dramatisation in a hospice bed with a borrowed laptop. It was broadcast as the Saturday Play in November 2010.

References

External links
  Sheffield Telegraph obituary by Paul Allen
 Dave Sheasby Radio Plays
 Soundscape Productions
 Review of  Trimming Pablo – British Theatre Guide 
 Dedicated website for Trimming Pablo

1940 births
2010 deaths
People educated at King Edward VII School, Sheffield
Alumni of the London School of Economics
English male dramatists and playwrights
20th-century English dramatists and playwrights
20th-century English male writers